Wilco Zeelenberg (born 19 August 1966) is a Dutch former professional Grand Prix motorcycle road racer and current race team manager with the Petronas Yamaha Sepang Racing Team.

Born in Bleiswijk, he began racing motorcycles in motocross competitions before switching to road racing. Zeelenberg made his Grand Prix debut in the 80cc class in 1986. He won his first and only world championship race at the 1990 250cc German Grand Prix. His best season was in 1991, when he finished the season ranked fourth in the 250cc world championship riding a Honda.

Zeelenberg managed the Yamaha factory racing team in the Supersport World Championship with riders Cal Crutchlow and Fabien Foret. Crutchlow claimed the 2009 Supersport World Championship. In 2010, Zeelenberg took on the role as team manager for Jorge Lorenzo in the Yamaha MotoGP team. He later served the same role for Maverick Viñales after Lorenzo's departure from the squad.

With the new entry of the Petronas Yamaha SRT into MotoGP, Zeelenberg moved to become team manager with the new Yamaha satellite team.

Career statistics

Grand Prix motorcycle racing

Races by year
(key) (Races in bold indicate pole position) (Races in italics indicate fastest lap)

Supersport World Championship

Races by year
(key) (Races in bold indicate pole position) (Races in italics indicate fastest lap)

External links
 Wilco Zeelenberg interview

References 

1966 births
Living people
Dutch motorcycle racers
250cc World Championship riders
People from Lansingerland
80cc World Championship riders
Supersport World Championship riders
Sportspeople from South Holland
20th-century Dutch people